Ionica may refer to:

People
Ionică, a Romanian version of John (given name)
Viorica Ionică (born 1955), a Romanian handballer
Ionică Minune (born 1959), a Romani-Romanian accordionist
Ionica Munteanu (born 1979), a Romanian female handballer
Ionica Smeets (born 1979), a Dutch mathematician and science journalist
Ionică Tăutu (1798–1828), a Moldavian boyar

Other uses
Ionica (company), a former British telecoms provider
Ionica, a poem by Panyassis, 5th century BC
Ionica, a poetry anthology by William Johnson Cory, 1858

See also

Ionic (disambiguation)
Adriatica Ionica Race, an Italian annual cycle race

Romanian feminine given names